Tino Chrupalla (/ˈtiːno kʁʊˈpala/; born 14 April 1975) is a German politician of the Alternative for Germany (AfD) party, and Member of the Bundestag since 2017. In November 2019, he was nominated by Alexander Gauland to replace him as co-chairman and later elected to the position. Since 2019, Chrupalla has served as chairman and lead spokesman for the AfD.

Biography
Chrupalla was born on 14 April 1975 in Weißwasser, then in East Germany. In 2003 qualified via profession education examen as house painter and varnisher master. He later went on to become the owner of a construction company. Chrupalla is married with two children.

In March 2020, two protestors set fire to Chrupalla's car and he suffered mild injuries putting the blaze out. He condemned the attack as a direct attack on his family that went beyond all conceivable boundaries of political debate.

Political career

In the 1990s, Tino Chrupalla joined the Christian Democratic Youth, linked to the CDU. Chrupalla entered the AfD in 2015 and in 2016 was elected to its district committee for Görlitz. At the 2017 German federal election, he defeated Michael Kretschmer, later Minister-President of Saxony, in the electoral district of Görlitz.

Chrupalla is one of five deputy chief whips of the AfD federal parliamentary group.

Ahead of the 2021 German federal election, Chrupalla was the AfD's leading candidate for the Bundestag alongside Alice Weidel. Together with Weidel, he was elected group leader of the AfD parliamentary group in the Bundestag on 30 September 2021, replacing Alexander Gauland, who remained as honorary chairman as part of the redefinition of the office.

Positions
German newspaper Zeit has characterized Chrupalla as one of the more relatively moderate members of the AfD parliamentary faction. Ahead of the 2021 German federal election, Chrupalla cited border security as his main concern and called for Germany to reinstate border controls to "curb border crime". As federal spokesman, Chrupalla repeatedly called on the AfD to unite and "stop thinking in camps".

In a Bundestag debate on 8 November 2019 on the subject of 30 years since the fall of the Berlin Wall, Chrupalla caused a stir when he accused the Chancellor Angela Merkel of having learned from the Free German Youth in East Germany on how to keep a people in check with propaganda and agitation, based on "strategies of domination and disintegration."

At the invitation of the Russian Defense Ministry in Summer 2021, Chrupalla gave a speech at a conference in which he spoke of Allied "psychological warfare" after World War II, whose re-education allegedly had a lasting impact on German national identity. Chruppalla compared the alleged policies of the Western Allies after 1945 with Nazi propaganda.

When the Russian invasion of Ukraine happened half a year later, he said "This war also has several fathers. ... Of course, the role of NATO and the role of the federal government of Germany must also be discussed here."

In December 2021, Chrupalla expressed opposition to mandatory COVID vaccinations during a debate on the show ZDF-Morgenmagazin, but argued vaccination would make sense for the elderly and those who were previously ill. When the moderator Andreas Wunn stated ICU doctors confirmed that 80 to 90 percent of Covid patients in intensive care units were unvaccinated, Chrupalla claimed the numbers were unconfirmed and blamed budget cuts and downsizing of medical departments as the problem for overloaded ICUs.

References

External links 

 Official website 
 Tino Chrupalla at abgeordnetenwatch.de 
  Biography at the Bundestag 

1975 births
Members of the Bundestag for Saxony
Living people
Members of the Bundestag 2017–2021
Members of the Bundestag for the Alternative for Germany
Members of the Bundestag 2021–2025